Scott Elliott Tercero (born October 28, 1981) is a former American football guard in the National Football League (NFL).

Professional career

Pre-draft

References

1981 births
Living people
Players of American football from Los Angeles
Sportspeople from Whittier, California
American football offensive guards
California Golden Bears football players
St. Louis Rams players